Gerhard Marx (born 1976) is a South African artist.

Biography
Born in 1976, he completed his master's degree in Fine Arts cum laude at the University of Cape Town in 2004.  He has worked with well-known artists such as William Kentridge and the Handspring Puppet Company

He currently teaches at the University of the Witwatersrand, in Johannesburg.

Works
The theatre piece Tshepang (Gerhard Marx - co director, Lara Foot-Newton – director) was chosen as one of the twelve feature film projects for January 2007 Screenwriters Lab by the Sundance Institute.
The play “Hear and Now” was presented at the Baxter Theatre Centre during 2005.

Controversy
According to Art News South Africa of April 2006, Marx considered legal action against BMW shortly after an ad campaign created by agency Ireland-Davenport  allegedly infringed on his copyright. Art News South Africa reproduced both the controversial ad – removed from circulation after a short run, and a close-up of Marx's work. His agent, Warren Siebrits had already confirmed in March 2006 that Marx will be represented by the copyright lawyer Owen Dean, better known for The Lion Sleeps Tonight case.

References

1976 births
Living people
South African artists
Michaelis School of Fine Art alumni